The 1897 VFL season was the inaugural season of the Victorian Football League (VFL), the new highest-level senior Australian rules football competition in Victoria. The season featured eight clubs, ran from 8 May until 4 September, and comprised a 14-game home-and-away season followed by a finals series featuring the top four clubs.

The inaugural premiership was won by the Essendon Football Club after it won all three of its matches in the finals series.

Premiership season
In 1897, the VFL competition consisted of eight teams of 20 on-the-field players each, with no "reserves" (although any of the 20 players who had left the playing field for any reason could later resume their place on the field at any time during the match).

Each team played each other twice in a home-and-away season of 14 rounds.

Once the 14-round home-and-away season had finished, the 1897 VFL Premiers were determined according to the conditions dictated by the specific format and conventions of the 1897 Finals System, which was used in this season only. A round-robin finals series has only been used once since, in 1924.

Round 1

Round 2

Round 3

Round 4

Round 5

Round 6

Round 7

Fitzroy's Draw with South Melbourne was the First in AFL/VFL History

Round 8

Round 9

Round 10

Round 11

Round 12

Round 13

Round 14

Win/Loss table

Bold – Home game
X – Bye
Opponent for round listed above margin

Ladder

Ladder progression
Numbers highlighted in green indicates the team finished the round inside the top 4.
Numbers highlighted in blue indicates the team finished in first place on the ladder in that round.
Numbers highlighted in red indicates the team finished in last place on the ladder in that round.
Subscript numbers indicate ladder position at round's end.

Finals series

Week 1

Week 2

Week 3

Finals Ladder

Grand final
As Essendon won the premiership for finishing on top of the round-robin finals ladder, no Grand Final was required.

See List of Australian Football League premiers for a complete list.

Awards

Leading goalkicker medal
Larger numbers indicate number of goals scored in each round. Subscript numbers indicate total cumulative goals scored through that round.
Numbers highlighted in blue indicates the player that was the leading goalkicker at the end of that round.
Numbers underlined indicates the player did not play in that round.

Other Awards
 The 1897 VFL Premiership team was Essendon.
 The Argus newspaper's "Player of the Year" was Melbourne's Fred McGinis.
 The 1897 Wooden Spoon went to St Kilda.

Notable events
The game between Essendon and Melbourne in the third round of the round-robin tournament holds the record for the lowest combined score in a match in VFL/AFL history: 1.16 (22).
 George Stuckey, the captain of the Essendon Football Club team that won the VFL's inaugural premiership, also won the 130-yard Stawell Gift in 1897 in 12.2 seconds off a handicap of 12 yards.
 In the first round of 1897, the VFL revoked the VFA's (then prevailing) push-in-the-back rule. The rule was reinstated before the second round's matches on the following Saturday due to complaints from fans, players and officials.
 On 12 June, a League representative team played against a Ballarat Football League representative team at the Brunswick Street Oval. Ballarat 13.11 (89) defeated the League 8.6 (54).
 On 3 July 1897, Fitzroy rover Bill McSpeerin weaved his way and bounced the ball the length of the Brunswick Street Oval to score a goal against St Kilda.
 Fred Waugh was unable to play in South Melbourne's team for the Round 11 game with St Kilda after attempting suicide. He had been spurned by his lover, and had become disconsolate. His mother found him in his room covered in blood, having cut his throat with a blunt knife. Luckily, he missed severing his windpipe and blood vessels, and a doctor was able to repair the wounds.
 Carlton's first six matches were all away games due to renovations at Princes Park, with the first game at Princes Park being a 5.6 (36) loss to Collingwood 6.4 (40) on 22 June, the Diamond Jubilee Holiday.
 The first-round finals match between Geelong and Essendon at the Corio Oval was the only finals match to be played in Geelong until 2013.

Footnotes

References
 Maplestone, M., Flying Higher: History of the Essendon Football Club 1872–1996, Essendon Football Club, (Melbourne), 1996. 
 Rogers, S. & Brown, A., Every Game Ever Played: VFL/AFL Results 1897–1997 (Sixth Edition), Viking Books, (Ringwood), 1998. 
 Ross, J. (ed), 100 Years of Australian Football 1897–1996: The Complete Story of the AFL, All the Big Stories, All the Great Pictures, All the Champions, Every AFL Season Reported, Viking, (Ringwood), 1996.

External links
 1897 Season – AFL Tables

Australian Football League seasons
VFL season